Cabo Frio Lighthouse is an active lighthouse located on the southern point of the Ilha do Cabo Frio, called Focinho do Cabo, in the municipality of Arraial do Cabo, Brazil.

History
The lantern was equipped with catoptrics lens and parabolic reflectors lit by 18 oil lamps. As the top of the island was frequently covered by fog, due to the cold Antarctic currents, the lighthouse was not always operational. It was decided to build another lighthouse on the southern point of the island at a lower altitude.

The lighthouse is managed by Brazilian Navy and is identified by the country code number BR-2400. Because of the difficulty of reaching the lighthouse from the pier, an helipad was built nearby the keeper's housing.

See also
List of lighthouses in Brazil

References

External links
  Centro de Sinalização Náutica Almirante Moraes Rego

Lighthouses in Brazil